Ostrov Borok (Russian: остров Борок) is a natural monument listed among the protected areas of Ulyanovsk Oblast in Russia.

The territory is heavily forested, and its trees are home to a large colony of grey herons, with approximately 403 breeding pairs. The nitrogen-rich soil allows nettles and celandine in to grow large quantities. Birds are common here, including black hawk, cheglok, sea-eagle, vyakhir, coast swallow, the eastern Zavirushka bluebird, finches, seagulls, and krachki. The area is also the habitat of the quick lizard and raccoon dogs.

Felling trees is forbidden in this territory and human visits are limited to fishermen, hunters,  and scientists observing the biocenosis.

References
 https://web.archive.org/web/20071231205649/http://eco.ulstu.ru/
 

Landforms of Ulyanovsk Oblast
Protected areas of Russia
Islands of Russia
River islands of Russia